A gas burner is a device that produces a controlled flame by mixing a fuel gas such as acetylene, natural gas, or propane with an oxidizer such as the ambient air or supplied oxygen, and allowing for ignition and combustion.

The flame is generally used for the heat, infrared radiation, or visible light it produces. Some burners, such as gas flares, dispose of unwanted or uncontainable flammable gases. Some burners are operated to produce carbon black.

The gas burner has many applications such as soldering, brazing, and welding, the latter using oxygen instead of air for producing a hotter flame, which is required for melting steel. Chemistry laboratories use natural-gas fueled Bunsen burners. In domestic and commercial settings gas burners are commonly used in gas stoves and cooktops. For melting metals with melting points of up to 1100 °C (such as copper, silver, and gold), a propane burner with a natural drag of air can be used. For higher temperatures, acetylene is commonly used in combination with oxygen.

Flame temperatures of common gases and fuels

The above data is given with the following assumptions:
The flame is adiabatic
The surrounding air is at 20°C, 1 bar (atm)
Complete combustion (no soot, and more blue-like flame is the key) (Stoichiometric)
Peak Temperature These notes are not assumptions, and need more clarification:
Speed of Combustion (has no effect on temperature, but more energy released per second (as adiabatic) compared to normal flame)
Spectral bands also affect colour of flame, as of what part and elements of combustion
Blackbody radiation (colour appearance only because of heat)
Atmosphere - affects temperature of flame and colour due to the atmospheric colour effect

Flammability limits and ignition temperatures of common gases

(Atmosphere is air at 20 degrees Celsius.)

Combustion values of common gases

References
Pocket Guide to Fire and Arson Investigation, second edition, FM Global, Table 1, 2, and 3
Gas burner at the Encyclopedia Britannica

Burners
Fuel gas
Tools
Welding
Methane
Acetylene
Propane
Butane